Mir Ghulam Muhammad Ghubar ( (1897 – February 5, 1978) was a social democratic politician, writer, prominent historian, journalist, and a poet from Afghanistan. He is the author of a number of books, including Afghanistan's history book called Afghanistan in the Course of History. He has also written Tareekh-e Ahmad Shah Baba in 1943, which is about the 18th century Afghan Emir Ahmad Shah Durrani and his Durrani Empire.

Ghubar was born in or about 1897 in the city of Kabul, in Afghanistan. He spent some of his time in the cities of Qandahar and Farah, in the south of the country where he wrote several of his books. His original language was Persian.

References

External links 
 sites.google.com/site/mgmghobar.
 www.youtube.com/Marhoom Mir Ghulam Muhammad Ghobar's Biographical Video.
[https://ia800107.us.archive.org/20/items/AfghanistanInTheCourseOfHistorybyGhobarVol2English/Afghanistan_in_the_course_of_history_Mir_Gholam_M_Ghobar_vol2__English.pdf pp. 231 - 234: 

1897 births
1978 deaths
Afghan socialists
Afghan democracy activists
Afghan politicians
20th-century Afghan historians
People from Kabul